Alison Miller (born 30 October 1984) is a rugby union player. She was a member of 's 2014 Women's Rugby World Cup squad. She scored a try in their memorable victory over the Black Ferns at the 2014 World Cup.

Miller began playing rugby union while attending Waterford IT.

References

External links
Irish Rugby player profile

1984 births
Living people
Irish female rugby union players
Ireland women's international rugby union players
Alumni of Waterford Institute of Technology
Ireland international women's rugby sevens players
Rugby union players from County Waterford
Old Belvedere R.F.C. players
Connacht Rugby women's players